John D. Rockefeller Jr. Memorial Parkway is a scenic road and protected area that connects Grand Teton National Park and Yellowstone National Park in the U.S. state of Wyoming. It is federally owned and managed by the National Park Service by Grand Teton National Park. It is named in remembrance of John D. Rockefeller Jr., a conservationist and philanthropist who was instrumental in the creation and enlargement of numerous national parks including Grand Teton, Virgin Islands, Acadia and the Great Smoky Mountains. This parkway carries U.S. Route 89, U.S. Route 191, and U.S. Route 287

Caribou-Targhee National Forest borders the parkway on the west and Bridger-Teton National Forest and the Teton Wilderness forms the eastern border.

The land was originally part of Teton National Forest and was transferred to the National Park Service from the United States Forest Service to assure an unbroken connection between Grand Teton and Yellowstone National Parks. The parkway road itself extends from the northern end of Grand Teton National Park, through the parkway lands, and then on to West Thumb Geyser Basin in Yellowstone National Park, a distance of 27 miles (43 km). 

The parkway is a transitional zone in terms of geology with ancient lava beds being found in the north and the granitic rocks of the Teton Range in the south. The Snake River flows through the parkway as it heads south to Jackson Lake and is considered a prime trout fly fishing area. In Grand Teton and Yellowstone, grizzly bears, black bears, moose, elk, bighorn sheep and mule deer can be found there. The Yellowstone fires of 1988 affected the northern sections of the parkway consuming ). As of 2005, the forest had begun to be rejuvenated and wildlife habitat had actually increased due to better mix of meadow and forest lands. A major relocation project for the Flagg Ranch concession operation (consisting of a lodge, gas station, camp store, cabins and a campground) from along the Snake River to a point higher up and less visible from the road was completed in 2002. Rafting is a popular activity during the summer and guided snowmobile tours use the parkway as a starting point for trips into Yellowstone during the winter.

See also
 Rockefeller family

External links
 
 

1972 establishments in Wyoming
Bridger–Teton National Forest
Caribou-Targhee National Forest
Federal lands in Wyoming
Greater Yellowstone Ecosystem
National Park Service areas in Wyoming
Protected areas established in 1972
Protected areas of Teton County, Wyoming
Roads in Wyoming
Rockefeller family
Transportation in Teton County, Wyoming
United States federal parkways